Maurice Régamey (1924–2009) was a Polish-born French actor and film director.

Selected filmography
 The Idiot (1946)
 Maya (1949)
 Cartouche, King of Paris (1950)
 Old Boys of Saint-Loup (1950)
 Lady Paname (1950)
 Rue des Saussaies (1951)
 Duel in Dakar (1951)
 The Village (1953)
 Honoré de Marseille (1956)
 Rendez-vous avec Maurice Chevalier n°1 (1957)
 Rendez-vous avec Maurice Chevalier n°2 (1957)
 Rendez-vous avec Maurice Chevalier n°3 (1957)
 Rendez-vous avec Maurice Chevalier n°4 (1957)
 Cigarettes, Whiskey and Wild Women (1959)

References

Bibliography
 Philippe Rège. Encyclopedia of French Film Directors, Volume 1. Scarecrow Press, 2009.

External links

1924 births
2009 deaths
French male film actors
20th-century French screenwriters
French film directors
People from Boryslav
Polish emigrants to France